Hadrodactylus is a genus of parasitoid wasps belonging to the family Ichneumonidae.

The species of this genus are found in Europe, Africa and Northern America.

Species:
 Hadrodactylus bidentulus Thomson, 1883 
 Hadrodactylus coxatus Davis, 1897

References

Ichneumonidae
Ichneumonidae genera